Chavand may refer to:

Chavand, Maharashtra
Chavand, Rajasthan
Chavand, Gujarat